Huatulco National Park, also known as Bahias de Huatulco National Park is a national park of Oaxaca, Mexico. It was initially declared a protected area and later decreed as a National Park on July 24, 1998.

Flora and fauna
In the low lands of the park, there are 9,000 species of plants (about 50% of the species are reported throughout the country) in the forest and mangroves in the coastal belt.

Fauna species have been identified as 264, which includes armadillos and white-tailed deer. Bird species are counted at 701, which include hummingbirds, pelicans and hawks. The reptile species are counted to be 470, which include black iguana, salamanders and snakes. Dolphins, whales and turtles are sighted species off the coast line, out of the identified 100 amphibian species.

References

Protected areas established in 1998
National parks of Mexico
Ramsar sites in Mexico
Protected areas of Oaxaca
Biosphere reserves of Mexico
1998 establishments in Mexico
Southern Pacific dry forests